One Motorsport (formerly BTC Racing) is a British auto racing team based in Brackley, Northamptonshire owned and run by Steve Dudman. The team is best known for competing in the British Touring Car Championship.

British Touring Car Championship

Lexus IS (2006–2007)

They ran 2 Lexus IS 200 cars for Chris Stockton and Darren Dowling in the latter two rounds of the 2006 British Touring Car Championship season in preparation for a fuller campaign the following season.

They retained Stockton for 2007 but signed Nick Leason as their second driver, although he ultimately only contested the first 3 rounds.

Lexus IS and SEAT Toledo (2008)
For 2008, Stockton was joined initially by truck racing champion Stuart Oliver. They replaced the Lexus cars with ex-Motorbase SEATs after two rounds, but had little success. The team missed round 6 at Snetterton after reported financial problems. Gareth Howell made two appearances in place of Oliver.
The team were looking to enter the 2009 British Touring Car Championship season with two SEAT Leóns, but decided against this.

Chevrolet Cruze (2014)
The team returned to the BTCC in 2014 with Chris Stockton driving an NGTC Chevrolet Cruze, which was originally built for Silverline Chevrolet, however the car was never completed as RML decided not to race in 2012.

The team originally planned to enter during 2013, but made the decision to concentrate on building their NGTC Chevrolet Cruze hatchback.

In 2015, the team's TBL was sold to their title sponsor Automotive Brands who set up a two car Power Maxed Racing as a separate operation.

Chevrolet Cruze (2017)

In December 2016, the team announced plans to return to the grid with Chris Smiley and Dave Newsham announced as the drivers in a pair of Chevrolet Cruzes purchased back from Power Maxed Racing

Honda Civic Type R (FK2) (2018)
BTC Norlin switched to ex-Dynamics Honda Civics in 2018 as the works team switched to the new shape car. Daniel Lloyd took the team's first win at Croft then followed up by Chris Smiley at Rockingham, making him the last ever winner at the infamous oval track.

Honda Civic Type R (FK8) (2019-)
For the 2019 season, without title sponsor Norlin, BTC will run two Honda Civic Type R (FK8) cars. Chris Smiley has re-signed for another season and Josh Cook joins as his new teammate from Power Maxed Racing, while the team have also moved to a new facility in Brackley, Northamptonshire. The team started the Kwik Fit BTCC successfully, with Josh Cook leading the championship after the first race weekend at Brands Hatch, and ended the season in 4th position overall and as Independent runners-up in the Team and Driver standings. 

2020 saw the squad expand to a three-car outfit- continuing with the successful Honda Civic Type R FK8s. Josh Cook returned to the team for his second consecutive season, with 14-times BTCC race winner and former WTCC and BTCC Independent Champion Tom Chilton moving across from Motorbase Performance. BTCC rookie and new fan favourite Michael Crees completed the new line-up competing for the Jack Sears Trophy under The Clever Baggers with BTC Racing banner.

References

External links
BTC Racing official website

British Touring Car Championship teams
British racecar constructors
Auto racing teams established in 2006
British auto racing teams